Les Anarchistes is a 2015 French drama film directed by Elie Wajeman and co-written with Gaëlle Macé. It was selected to open the International Critics' Week section at the 2015 Cannes Film Festival.

Plot
In 1899, brigadier Corporal Jean Albertini is recruited to infiltrate a group of anarchists.

Cast
 Tahar Rahim as Corporal Jean Albertini
 Adèle Exarchopoulos as Judith Lorillard
 Swann Arlaud as Elisée
 Guillaume Gouix as Eugène Lévêque
 Cédric Kahn as Gaspar
 Sarah Le Picard as Marie-Louise Chevandier
 Karim Leklou as Biscuit
 Emilie de Preissac as Clothilde Lapiower
 Thilbault Lacroix as Albert Vuillard
 Arieh Worthalter as Adrian
 Simon Bellouard as Hans
 Aurélia Poirier as Martha

Accolades

References

External links
 
 

2015 films
2010s French-language films
2010s political drama films
French political drama films
Films about anarchism
Films set in France
Films set in Paris
Films set in 1899
Films shot in France
Films shot in Paris
2015 drama films
2010s French films